Little Sandy Pond is a  pond in Plymouth, Massachusetts, located between West Wind Shores and Buzzards Bay, and west of Cedarville. The pond is south of Big Sandy Pond and east of Little Rocky Pond. The western side of the pond along Bourne Road is heavily developed, while the eastern side is mostly undeveloped. Access to the pond is informal on the southern shore off Carters Bridge Road.

References

External links
MassWildlife - Pond Maps

Ponds of Plymouth, Massachusetts
Ponds of Massachusetts